Maara is one of the three constituencies of Tharaka-Nithi County in Kenya.

References 

Constituencies in Tharaka-Nithi County